Mycena flavescens is a species of Mycenaceae fungus. It was first described scientifically by the Czech mycologist Josef Velenovský in 1920, based on specimens collected in Mnichovice in 1915. The mushroom is edible.

References

flavescens
Fungi of Europe
Fungi described in 1920